Cross Cut is an unincorporated community in Brown County, Texas, United States. According to the Handbook of Texas, the community had no population estimates in 2000. It is located within the Brownwood, Texas micropolitan area.

History
Cross Cut was originally called Cross Out because it was described as being "across the county and out of the way" of travel. John M. Bloodworth founded the community and opened a store there in 1878. The following year, a post office was established there, with Bloodworth as postmaster. He then changed the name of the community to Cross Cut. Not very much happened in the community during the 19th century, but it grew slightly during the 1920s when oil was discovered nearby. The store continued to operate in 1940 and had 75 residents. The population dipped to 45 in 1980, and no population was recorded in 2000. Its population dropped to 22 in 2010.

Geography

Education
In 1947, Cross Cut had a school that joined the Cross Plains Independent School District (Cross Plains ISD). The building continued to stand until it was demolished in 1999. The community continues to be served by Cross Plains ISD today.

References

Unincorporated communities in Brown County, Texas
Unincorporated communities in Texas